Hong Kong Community Cup, formerly known as Hong Kong Community Shield , is the football super cup competition in Hong Kong played between the winners of the Hong Kong Premier League (previously the Hong Kong First Division League) and the Hong Kong FA Cup (previously the Hong Kong Season Play-offs). If the Premier League champions also won the FA Cup title, the FA Cup runners-up would be qualified for the Community Cup.

Community Shield
The Community Shield was only held once in 2009.

2009: Kitchee 2–0 South China

Community Cup

Key

Results

Performance by clubs

References

 
National association football supercups
Football competitions in Hong Kong